C
This is a list of Commercial bank with International Authorization in Nigeria, arranged alphabetically: 

 Access Bank Plc
 Fidelity Bank Plc
 First City Monument Bank Limited
 First Bank of Nigeria Limited
 Guaranty Trust Holding Company Plc
 Union Bank of Nigeria Plc
 United Bank for Africa Plc
 [

This is a list of Commercial banks with National Authorization in Nigeria, arranged alphabetically:

 Citibank Nigeria Limited
 Ecobank Nigeria 
 Heritage Bank Plc
 Keystone Bank Limited
 Polaris Bank Limited. The successor to Skye Bank Plc.
 Stanbic IBTC Bank Plc
 Standard Chartered
 Sterling Bank Plc
 Titan Trust bank
 Unity Bank Plc
 Wema Bank Plc

This is a list of Commercial banks with Regional Authorization in Nigeria, arranged alphabetically:

 Globus Bank Limited
 Parallex Bank Limited
 PremiumTrust Bank Limited
 Providus Bank Limited
SunTrust Bank Nigeria Limited

This is a list of non-interest banks in Nigeria, arranged alphabetically:

Jaiz Bank Plc
LOTUS BANK
 TAJBank Limited

This is a list of Microfinance Banks in Nigeria:
 Mutual Trust Microfinance Bank
 Rephidim Microfinance Bank
 Shepherd Trust Microfinance Bank
 Empire Trust Microfinance Bank
 Finca Microfinance Bank Limited
 Fina Trust Microfinance Bank
 Accion Microfinance Bank
 Peace Microfinance Bank
 Infinity Microfinance Bank
 Pearl Microfinance Bank Limited
 Covenant Microfinance Bank Ltd
 Advans La Fayette Microfinance Bank

This is a list of Online-Only Microfinance Banks in Nigeria:
 Sparkle Bank
 Kuda Bank
 Moniepoint Microfinance Bank
 Opay
 Palmpay
 Rubies Bank
 VFD Microfinance Bank
 Mint Finex MFB
 Mkobo MFB

This is a list of Merchant banks in Nigeria, arranged alphabetically:

 Coronation Merchant Bank
 FBNQuest Merchant Bank
 FSDH Merchant Bank
 Rand Merchant Bank
 Nova Merchant Bank.

See also
 List of banks in Africa
 Central Bank of Nigeria
 Economy of Nigeria

References

External links
 List of deposit money banks and financial holding companies operating in Nigeria as at December 29, 2017

 
Banks
Nigeria
Nigeria